Matli is the largest Tehsil of Badin District in the Sindh province of Pakistan. It is administratively subdivided into 12 union councils.  The people here speak Sindhi Bhil.

Religion

Notes

References

Populated places in Badin District
Talukas of Sindh
Tehsils of Sindh